Harriet Elizabeth Byrd (April 20, 1926 – January 27, 2015) was an American politician and educator from Wyoming who was the first African-American elected to the Wyoming Legislature.

Early life and education
Byrd was born Harriet Elizabeth Rhone in Cheyenne, Wyoming, and was the daughter of Robert C. "Buck" Rhone, a first class mechanic for Union Pacific Railroad, and Sudie Smith Rhone, a homemaker. Her paternal grandfather Charles J. Rhone first settled in Wyoming in 1876, where he worked as a cowboy and railroader in Cheyenne and Laramie, Wyoming. She graduated from Cheyenne High School in 1944.

Byrd graduated with a Bachelor of Arts degree in education from West Virginia State College, a historically black college in Institute, West Virginia in 1949. In 1976, she earned a Master of Arts degree from the University of Wyoming.

Career 
After graduating from college, Byrd returned to Wyoming in order to apply for a teaching job with the Laramie County School District, but was denied employment because of her race. She was subsequently hired as a civilian instructor in the Department of Administrative Services at F.E. Warren Air Force Base in Wyoming. In 1959, the Laramie County School District reversed its earlier decision and hired her as an elementary school teacher based in Cheyenne for 27 years.

Byrd served in the Wyoming House of Representatives from 1980 to 1988, and in the Wyoming Senate from 1988 to 1992, becoming the first African-American to serve in both houses. During her career in the state legislature, she sponsored legislation establishing a state holiday in honor of Martin Luther King Jr., achieving a partial victory in 1991 through the establishment of the Martin Luther King, Jr./Wyoming Equality Day which is popularly recognized as King Day in the state. Other legislation she sponsored included requiring the use of child safety restraints, expansion of available handicapped parking, and establishment of social services programs for adults.

Personal life 
In 1947, Byrd married James W. Byrd on August 8, 1947, who would later become the first African-American police chief in Wyoming in 1966. The couple had three children: Robert, James, and Linda; and six grandchildren. Their son, also named James W. Byrd served in the Wyoming House of Representatives from 2009 to 2019, and was a candidate for Wyoming Secretary of State in the 2018 election.

Following her retirement from the Wyoming Legislature in 1992, Byrd lived with her husband in Cheyenne, Wyoming, until his death on December 5, 2005. Byrd died on January 27, 2015, at her home in Cheyenne, Wyoming.

References

External links 

 Harriett Elizabeth Byrd collection at The University of Wyoming - American Heritage Center
 Select digital collection of the Harriett Elizabeth Byrd papers on the AHC digital archive

1926 births
2015 deaths
Politicians from Cheyenne, Wyoming
Democratic Party Wyoming state senators
Democratic Party members of the Wyoming House of Representatives
African-American women in politics
Women state legislators in Wyoming
African-American schoolteachers
Schoolteachers from Wyoming
American women educators
African-American state legislators in Wyoming
Cheyenne Central High School alumni
West Virginia State University alumni
University of Wyoming alumni
20th-century American women politicians
20th-century American politicians
20th-century African-American women
20th-century African-American politicians
21st-century African-American women